Lesley Chamberlain (born 26 September 1951, Rochford, Essex) is a British journalist, travel writer and historian of Russian and German culture and has published short stories and novels and written about food.

Following her secondary education at Glanmôr Grammar School for Girls, she studied German and Russian at Exeter and Oxford Universities.

After becoming a Reuter's correspondent in 1978, she later became a full-time writer; her first book was published in 1982. She has written for The Independent, The Times Literary Supplement and Prospect magazine.

Chamberlain is married to Pavel Seifter, the former Czech ambassador to the United Kingdom.

Arc of Utopia (2017)
Chamberlain here starts with Kant's imaginative understanding of the human capacities for self-transformation. She traces the influence of these ideas on subsequent artistic visions of beauty. Such a self-understanding of inherent human creativity then inspired thoughts of revolutionary political change. Her discussion traces the inspiration's philosophical evolution, and also follows its transplant from Germany to Russia during the long 19th century. From Schiller's plays and Hegel's dialectic it came to Herzen, from Fichte to Bakunin, and by various paths from Schelling, Heine, Feuerbach and Marx to Turgenev, Dostoevsky, and Plekhanov. The ultimate destination was the tragic Bolshevik revolution of 1917 and civil war that followed. Unfortunately, the result was not the "new kind of living" sought by some, but instead a "metaphysical disappointment", a "philosophical perversity" that led to a "harshly policed" industrial state.

"The great revolutionary art of 1895-1922" terminated. The "whole utopian journey" became an "abject self parody". The "freedom and openness" of the imagination "was not allowed to last" by the Soviet party and state.

References

Select bibliography
The Food and Cooking of Russia, 1982
Nietzsche in Turin, 1996
The Secret Artist: a Close Reading of Sigmund Freud, Quartet, 2000
Motherland A Philosophical History of Russia, Atlantic Books, 2004
Lenin's Private War: The Voyage of the Philosophy Steamer and the Exile of the Intelligentsia, St Martin's Press, 2007; UK: The Philosophy Steamer Lenin and the Exile of the Intelligentsia, Atlantic Books, 2006
A Shoe Story. Van Gogh, the Philosophers, and the West (Chelmsford: Harbour 2014)
Arc of Utopia. The beautiful story of the Russian Revolution (London: Reaktion 2017)
Street Life and Morals (London: Reaction 2021).
Rilke. The last inward man (London: Pushkin Press 2022).

External links
Official website

1951 births
Living people
British writers
People from Rochford